Starry is the second studio album by Purr Machine, released on March 16, 2007 by No Bliss Lost Records. The album was recorded with the collaborative efforts of Chris Vrenna of Nine Inch Nails/Tweaker, William Faith of Faith and the Muse, electronic artist Alex Gordon, Statik from Collide and guitarist Byron Brown of Mercurine.

Track listing

Personnel
Adapted from the Starry liner notes.

Purr Machine
 Kevin Kipnis – bass guitar, guitar, programming, keyboards, production, mixing
 Betsy Martin – lead vocals, photography

Additional performers
 Byron Brown – guitar (3, 12, 14)
 Charlie – vocals (4)
 William Faith – guitar (15)
 Alex Gordon – guitar (13, 15), additional production (15)
 Kirk Hellie – guitar (2, 4, 10)
 Todd Shoemaker – drums (13)
 Statik – drum programming (2, 11)
 Janice Stone – vocals (15), photography
 Chris Vrenna – drums (2, 4, 10, 15), arrangements (14)

Production and design
 Chad Blinman – additional production and additional mixing (10-12, 15)
 Tony Hoffer – vocal treatments (10)
 Gary Silva – photography
 Pierre Silva – photography
 Monica Richards – design

Release history

References

External links 
 
 Starry at iTunes
 

2007 albums
Purr Machine albums